"Heaven" is the debut single of American rock band Los Lonely Boys. The song was written by brothers Henry, Jojo and Ringo Garza, who comprise the foundation of the band, and it appears on their multi-platinum self-titled album.

Reception
Released as a single on January 26, 2004, "Heaven" reached the top 40 on the U.S. Billboard Hot 100 chart, peaking at 16 in August. Later that year, the song began a sixteen-week run at number one on the Billboard Adult Contemporary chart in October. It was also a minor hit at country radio, where it peaked at number 46.

AllMusic reviewer Thom Jurek describes the song as "infectious" and draws comparisons to the music of Freddie King, Stevie Ray Vaughan and Los Lobos. He states that "Heaven" is "a single in the old sense of the word: killer hook, easy groove, a slippery but unmistakable bridge with a beautiful vocal to boot -- all coming in under four minutes."

Awards
The success of "Heaven" led to two Grammy Award nominations and one win for the band at the 47th Grammy Awards, held in early 2005. The song won in the category Best Pop Performance by a Duo or Group with Vocal, while Los Lonely Boys were nominated in the category Best New Artist, losing out to Maroon 5.

Track listing
US and UK CD single
 "Heaven" (album version)
 "Heaven" (live acoustic version)

Charts and certifications

Weekly charts

Year-end charts

Certifications

Release history

In popular culture
 In later 2004, the song was covered by the Christian Latin rock band Salvador for their album: So Natural. The cover received heavy radio play on Christian radio.
 The song is featured in the 2008 Nintendo DS game Guitar Hero: On Tour with a completely different guitar track.
 Bo Bice performed "Heaven" as part of the fourth season of American Idol in May 2005, which led to a 77% increase in sales for Los Lonely Boys' self-titled album the week following this performance.
 The song is featured in the TNT television show Saving Grace, at the end of season one, episode one.

References

See also
List of Billboard Adult Contemporary number ones of 2004 and 2005 (U.S).

2004 singles
2004 songs
Epic Records singles
Los Lonely Boys songs
Macaronic songs